Daniel Le Meur was a French politician.  He was the deputy for Aisne's 2nd constituency from 1973 to 1993 (including the 8th legislature (1986-1988), when deputies were elected by proportional representation by department) and the  Mayor of Saint-Quentin, Aisne from 1977 to 1983 and from 1989 to 1995.
He was a member of the French Communist Party.

Biography
He worked as a metallurgical worker at Motobécane, where he was a CGT delegate in 1965.

He joined the Communist Party in 1956 and was part of the office of the Aisne federation. He was an alternate member of the central committee in February 1976 (XXIIth congress).

He was a Communist deputy for Aisne from 1973 to 1993 and mayor of Saint-Quentin from 1977 to 1983 and then from 1989 to 1995.

References

External links
 His page on the National Assembly site

1939 births
Living people
Deputies of the 5th National Assembly of the French Fifth Republic
Deputies of the 6th National Assembly of the French Fifth Republic
Deputies of the 7th National Assembly of the French Fifth Republic
Deputies of the 8th National Assembly of the French Fifth Republic
Deputies of the 9th National Assembly of the French Fifth Republic
French Communist Party politicians
Mayors of places in Hauts-de-France